István Szelei (born 7 December 1960) is a Hungarian former fencer. He won a bronze medal in the team foil event at the 1988 Summer Olympics.

References

External links
 

1960 births
Living people
Hungarian male foil fencers
Olympic fencers of Hungary
Fencers at the 1980 Summer Olympics
Fencers at the 1988 Summer Olympics
Olympic bronze medalists for Hungary
Olympic medalists in fencing
People from Szentes
Medalists at the 1988 Summer Olympics
Universiade medalists in fencing
Universiade silver medalists for Hungary
Medalists at the 1987 Summer Universiade
Sportspeople from Csongrád-Csanád County